Tiit Tamm (born on 18 April 1952 in Tallinn) is an Estonian ski jumper and coach.

1970-1979 he won several medals at Estonian Ski Jumping Championships. 

Since 1978 he worked as a coach. 

Students: Allar Levandi, Ago Markvardt, Peter Heli, Toomas Tiru, Magnar Freimuth, Ilmar Aluvee, Tambet Pikkor, Jens Salumäe.

Awards:
 1994: Estonian Coach of the Year

References

Living people
1952 births
Estonian male ski jumpers
Estonian sports coaches
Sportspeople from Tallinn